David Earl Pittman (born October 14, 1983) is a former American Football and Canadian football cornerback.  He was drafted by the Baltimore Ravens in the third round of the 2006 NFL Draft. He played college football at Northwestern State.

Pittman has also played for the New Orleans Saints, Houston Texans, New York Sentinels and Pittsburgh Steelers.

Early years
Pittman was a three-year letterman at Lutcher High School, where he played safety and cornerback.

Professional career

Baltimore Ravens
With the Baltimore Ravens, Pittman did not play in 2006, but had 10 tackles and two interceptions in 2007.

2008 season
Pittman split the 2008 NFL season with the New Orleans Saints and Houston Texans, but did not play in a game with either team.

New York Sentinels
Pittman was signed by the New York Sentinels of the United Football League on November 7, 2009.

Pittsburgh Steelers
On February 10, 2010, Pittman signed with the Pittsburgh Steelers.

Hartford Colonials
Pittman was signed by the Hartford Colonials on October 27, 2010.

Edmonton Eskimos

Calgary Stampeders

Pittman was signed during the 2012 preseason but was released on June 23, 2012.

References

External links
Just Sports Stats

1983 births
Living people
American football cornerbacks
Baltimore Ravens players
Edmonton Elks players
Hartford Colonials players
Houston Texans players
New Orleans Saints players
New York Sentinels players
Northwestern State Demons football players
People from Gramercy, Louisiana
Pittsburgh Steelers players
Players of American football from Louisiana